The 43rd Artillery Brigade is an artillery formation of the Ukrainian Ground Forces, based in Pereiaslav. On 3 November, 2022, they were awarded the battle honor "For Courage and Bravery" by President Volodymyr Zelenskyy.  By a 2020 decree, they are named after Taras Triasylo, a Hetman.

Current Structure 
As of 2017 the brigade's structure is as follows:

 43rd Heavy Artillery Brigade, Pereiaslav
 Headquarters & Headquarters Battery
 191st Self-propelled Artillery Battalion (2S7 Pion)
 209th Anti-tank Artillery Battalion (MT-12 Rapira)
 45th Motorized Infantry Battalion
 Engineer Company
 Maintenance Company
 Logistic Company
 CBRN-defense Platoon

References

Artillery brigades of Ukraine
Military units and formations established in 2014